The Sports Shinko International was a professional golf tournament in Japan in 1974 and 1975. It was an event on the Japan Golf Tour and offered the biggest prize on the tour during the summer months, ¥30 million in 1974. It was held at the Yamanohara Golf Club near Kawanishi in Hyōgo Prefecture.

Winners

References

Former Japan Golf Tour events
Defunct golf tournaments in Japan
Sport in Hyōgo Prefecture
Recurring sporting events established in 1974
Recurring sporting events disestablished in 1975
1974 establishments in Japan
1975 disestablishments in Japan